is a Japanese long-distance runner. He competed in the men's 10,000 metres at the 1968 Summer Olympics.

References

1945 births
Living people
Place of birth missing (living people)
Japanese male long-distance runners
Olympic male long-distance runners
Olympic athletes of Japan
Athletes (track and field) at the 1968 Summer Olympics
Japan Championships in Athletics winners